Paresh Rawal (born 30 May 1955) is an Indian actor, comedian, film producer and politician known for his works notably in Hindi films,  and Telugu, and a few Gujarati and a few Tamil films. He has appeared in over 240 films and is the recipient of various accolades. In 1994, he won the National Film Award for Best Supporting Actor for his performances in the films Woh Chokri and Sir. For the latter, he received his first Filmfare Award for Best Performance in a Negative Role. This was followed by Ketan Mehta's Sardar, which saw him playing the lead role of freedom fighter Vallabhbhai Patel, a role that got him national and international acclaim. He was honoured with Padma Shri from the Government of India in 2014. 

He has received recognition for his villainous roles in Telugu box office hits such as Kshana Kshanam (1991), Money (1993), Money Money (1995), Govinda Govinda (1994), Rikshavodu (1995), Bavagaru Bagunnara (1998).. His other notable works in Hindi cinema are Naam (1986),  Shiva (1990), Mohra (1994), Tamanna (1996), Aitraaz (2004), Table No. 21 (2013) and Zilla Ghaziabad (2013).

Rawal has gained acclaim with comedy and few intense supporting roles in Hindi films as some of his notable roles are in Andaz Apna Apna (1994), Chachi 420 (1997), Hera Pheri (2000), Nayak (2001), Aankhen (2002), Awara Paagal Deewana (2002), Hungama (2003), Garam Masala (2005), Phir Hera Pheri (2006), Chup Chup Ke (2006), Malamaal Weekly (2006),  Welcome (2007), Mere Baap Pehle Aap (2008), Oye Lucky! Lucky Oye! (2008),  De Dana Dan (2009), Atithi Tum Kab Jaoge? (2010), Ready (2010), OMG (2012), Welcome Back (2015), Tiger Zinda Hai (2017), Sanju  (2018), Uri (2019).  His most remembered role is of Baburao Ganpatrao Apte in the cult classic Hera Pheri comedy franchise, and he also appeared in Tamil film Soorarai Pottru (2020).

Personal life 

Rawal was born and raised in Bombay (present-day Mumbai) to a Gujarati Hindu family.

In 1987, Rawal married Swaroop Sampat, an actress and winner of the Miss India contest in 1979. Paresh and Swaroop have two sons, Aditya and Anirudh. He is an alumnus of Narsee Monjee College of Commerce & Economics, Vile Parle, Mumbai.

Career 
Rawal made his debut with the 1985 film Arjun in a supporting role. He was also part of the cast of the Doordarshan TV Serial, Bante Bigadte. It was the 1986 blockbuster Naam that established him as an actor with great talent. He then appeared in over 100 films throughout the 1980s and 1990s, mostly as the main villain, such as in Roop ki Rani Choron Ka Raja, Kabzaa, King Uncle, Ram Lakhan, Daud, Baazi and so many more. In the 1990s, he also starred in the cult comedy Andaz Apna Apna in which he played a double role. Rawal was perceived as a character actor by both audiences and critics until the 2000 Bollywood cult classic Hera Pheri, after which he starred in many Hindi mainstream films as a lead actor or main protagonist. Rawal played the dim-witted, boisterous and kind-hearted Marathi landlord Baburao Ganpatrao Apte in the film Hera Pheri, who takes in Raju (Akshay Kumar) and Shyam (Sunil Shetty) as paying guests in his house. Rawal's acting was a key reason for the major nationwide success the film received. For his performance, he won the Filmfare Best Comedian Award. He reprised his role as Baburao in the sequel to the film Phir Hera Pheri (2006), which was also successful.

Another notable lead role came in 2002 when Rawal portrayed one of three blind bank robbers in the hit film Aankhen, co-starring Amitabh Bachchan, Aditya Pancholi, Akshay Kumar, Arjun Rampal and Sushmita Sen. Rawal, for the remainder of the 2000s, was seen in mainly comedy oriented multi-starrers, mostly amongst the lead protagonists such as in Awara Paagal Deewana (2002), Hungama (2003),  Hulchul (2004), Garam Masala (2005), Deewane Huye Paagal (2005), Malamaal Weekly (2006), Golmaal: Fun Unlimited (2006), Chup Chup Ke (2006), Bhagam Bhag (2007), Shankar Dada MBBS (Telugu), Bhool Bhulaiyaa, Welcome, Mere Baap Pehle Aap (2008) and De Dana Dan (2009). In 2010, Rawal acted in the movie Aakrosh, based on honour killing.

In 2012, Rawal played the lead role in the movie OMG – Oh My God!. Akshay Kumar was seen supporting him, and both won rave reviews for their roles.
He has also had a very successful acting career in Gujarati plays, the latest one being Dear Father.
For television he has produced several Hindi soaps including Zee TV's Teen Bahuraaniyaan, Sahara One's Main Aisi Kyunn Hoon and Colors' Laagi Tujhse Lagan.

His latest notable release is Rajkumar Hirani's Sanju with Ranbir Kapoor. He plays actor Sunil Dutt's role in the movie.
He is also reprising his role as Baburao Ganpatrao Apte in Hera Pheri 3 which was going to be released in 2024, but is 'on hold' as of May 2023.

On 10 September 2020 he was appointed as the chief of the National School of Drama, by the President of India

In 2021, Rawal appeared in sports drama Toofaan, a film directed by Rakeysh Omprakash Mehra, alongside Farhan Akhtar, who is playing a national level boxer. The film was streamed worldwide on 16 July 2021 on Amazon Prime Video.

His other upcoming films are Aankh Micholi,Hera Pheri 3 and The Storyteller in which he will portray Satyajit Ray's famous character Tarini Khuro.

Politics 
He won as the Bharatiya Janata Party's Member of Parliament (MP) from Ahmedabad East constituency in the 2014 Indian general election. In 2014, he was awarded Padma Shri.

Controversy 
On 21 May 2017, Rawal tweeted  addressing an incident where the Indian Army tied a Kashmiri stone pelter as a human shield on an army jeep: "Instead of tying stone pelter on the army jeep, tie Arundhati Roy." It was presumed that he wanted Roy to be used as a human shield. Rawal's tweet provoked controversy. He was criticised by fellow actor Swara Bhaskar. Rawal was also criticised by Congress leader Shobha Ojha. while filmmaker Ashoke Pandit supported his tweet.

Filmography

Awards and honours 

 In 2014, he was awarded the Padma Shri by the Government of India, the fourth highest civilian award in India, for his contributions to the entertainment industry.
National Film Awards
 1994: National Film Award for Best Supporting Actor for Sir & Woh Chokri

Filmfare Awards
 1994: Filmfare Award for Best Performance in a Negative Role for Sir
 1995: Nominated–[Filmfare Award for Best Performance in a Comic Role]] for Mohra
1994: Nominated–Filmfare Award for Best Supporting Actor for Raja
 1998: Nominated–Filmfare Award for Best Performance in a Comic Role for Chachi 420
 2001: Filmfare Award for Best Performance in a Comic Role for Hera Pheri
 2002: Nominated–Filmfare Award for Best Performance in a Comic Role for Yeh Teraa Ghar Yeh Meraa Ghar
 2003: Nominated–Filmfare Award for Best Performance in a Comic Role for Aankhen
 2003: Filmfare Award for Best Performance in a Comic Role for Awara Paagal Deewana
2004: Nominated–Filmfare Award for Best Performance in a Comic Role for Fun 2shh: Dudes in the 10th Century
 2004: Nominated–Filmfare Award for Best Performance in a Comic Role for Hungama
 2005: Nominated–Filmfare Award for Best Performance in a Comic Role for Hulchul
 2007: Nominated–Filmfare Award for Best Performance in a Comic Role for Phir Hera Pheri
IIFA Awards
 2001: Nominated–IIFA Award for Best Supporting Actor for Har Dil Jo Pyar Karega
 2001: IIFA Award for Best Performance in a Comic Role for Hera Pheri
 2004: Nominated–IIFA Award for Best Performance in a Comic Role for Hungama & Baghban
2005: Nominated–IIFA Award for Best Supporting Actor for Aitraaz
 2005: Nominated–IIFA Award for Best Performance in a Comic Role for Hulchul
 2007: Nominated–IIFA Award for Best Performance in a Comic Role for Phir Hera Pheri
 2008: Nominated–IIFA Award for Best Performance in a Comic Role for Bhool Bhulaiyaa
 2009: Nominated–IIFA Award for Best Performance in a Negative Role for Oye Lucky! Lucky Oye!
 2011: Nominated–IIFA Award for Best Supporting Actor for Atithi Tum Kab Jaoge?
 2012: Nominated–IIFA Award for Best Performance in a Comic Role for Ready
 2013: Nominated–IIFA Award for Best Performance in a Comic Role for OMG – Oh My God!
Star Screen Awards
 1996: Screen Award for Best Supporting Actor for Raja
 2001: Screen Award for Best Comedian for Hera Pheri
 2002: Nominated–Screen Award for Best Comedian for Aankhen
 2003: Screen Award for Best Comedian for Awara Paagal Deewana
Zee Cine Awards
 2001: Zee Cine Award for Best Actor in a Comic Role for Hera Pheri
 2003: Zee Cine Award for Best Actor in a Comic Role for Awara Paagal Deewana
 2010: Nominated–Zee Cine Award for Best Actor in a Comic Role for Atithi Tum Kab Jaoge?
 2010: Nominated–Zee Cine Award for Best Actor in a Negative Role for Aakrosh
Producers Guild Film Awards
 2010: Producers Guild Film Award for Best Actor in a Comic Role for Atithi Tum Kab Jaoge?
 2012: Nominated–Producers Guild Film Award for Best Actor in a Comic Role for Ready
Bollywood Movie Awards
 2001: Bollywood Movie Award for Best Comedian for Hera Pheri
 2004: Bollywood Movie Award for Best Comedian for Hungama
Other Awards
2006: Sardar Patel International Award for Best Actor for Sardar (1993).

References

External links 

 
 An interview with Paresh Rawal
 I feel secure with Akshay: Paresh Rawal
 Bollywood Collections of Paresh Rawal
Paresh Rawal Starts shooting for Hera Pheri 3

1955 births
Living people
Indian male film actors
Indian male comedians
Indian male voice actors
Male actors in Hindi cinema
Indian television producers
Filmfare Awards winners
Screen Awards winners
Zee Cine Awards winners
Best Supporting Actor National Film Award winners
Male actors from Gujarat
Indian male stage actors
Gujarati theatre
Age controversies
Recipients of the Padma Shri in arts
India MPs 2014–2019
Indian actor-politicians
Lok Sabha members from Gujarat
Bharatiya Janata Party politicians from Gujarat